The 2021 FINA Swimming World Cup was a series of four three-day meets in four different cities in October 2021. This edition was held in the short course (25-meter pool) format.

Meets
The 2021 World Cup consisted of the following four meets.

World Cup standings

Men

Women

Event winners

50 m freestyle

100 m freestyle

200 m freestyle

400 m freestyle

1500 m (men) / 800 m (women) freestyle

50 m backstroke

100 m backstroke

200 m backstroke

50 m breaststroke

100 m breaststroke

200 m breaststroke

50 m butterfly

100 m butterfly

200 m butterfly

100 m individual medley

200 m individual medley

400 m individual medley

4 × 50 m mixed relays

Legend:

References

FINA Swimming World Cup
FINA Swimming World Cup